Karczowice  is a village in the administrative district of Gmina Kozłów, within Miechów County, Lesser Poland Voivodeship, in southern Poland.

The village has a population of 220.

References

Karczowice